Mark Knowles and Daniel Nestor were the defending champions, but lost in semifinals to Bob Bryan and Mike Bryan.

Fabrice Santoro and Nenad Zimonjić won the title, defeating Bob Bryan and Mike Bryan 6–4, 6–7(4–7), [10–7] in the final.

Seeds
All seeds received a bye into the second round.

Draw

Finals

Top half

Bottom half

External links
 Main Doubles draw (ATP)

Italian Open - Doubles
Men's Doubles